AXN White is a channel operated by Sony Pictures Television International Networks Europe. Its programming is focused on comedy and romantic television series and movies. The channel was launched in Portugal on 14 April 2012 and in Spain on 7 May 2012 replacing Sony Entertainment Television.
The channel replaced AXN Crime on 1 October 2013 in Hungary, Poland, Romania, Czech Republic, Slovakia and Moldova.
On October 3, 2017 the channel was replaced by  Sony Max  in Hungary.

Television series on AXN White

All Saints
The Amazing Race
The Big Bang Theory
Carpoolers
Community
Cougar Town
Devious Maids
Drop Dead Diva
Frasier
Gossip Girl
The Guardian
Haven
How to Get Away with Murder
In Case of Emergency
Joan of Arcadia
Judging Amy
Lincoln Heights
McLeod's Daughters
Medium
Miracles
The Mentalist
Naked Josh
One Tree Hill
Offspring
Packed to the Rafters
Parks and Recreation
Party of Five
Pretty Little Liars
Privileged
Private Practice
Relic Hunter
Sabrina, the Teenage Witch
Scandal
The Secret Life of the American Teenager
Sex and the City
Station 19
Switched at Birth
Top Chef
Two and a Half Men
The West Wing
Unsolved Mysteries
Young Sheldon

References

Gallery

External links 
 

AXN
Television stations in Portugal
Defunct television channels in Hungary
Television stations in Spain
Sony Pictures Entertainment
Sony Pictures Television
Portuguese-language television stations
Television channels and stations established in 2008
2008 establishments in Portugal